Microtis is a genus of sea snails, marine gastropod mollusks in the family Trochidae, the top snails.

Description
The spiral shell is suborbicular and  depressed. It has two tuberculated ridges. The spire is slightly projecting. The aperture is very large, and wider than long. Its interior is pearly within. The columellar margin is spiral and visible as far as the apex  of the spire. There is no operculum.

Species
Species within the genus Microtis (gastropod) include:
 Microtis tuberculata A. Adams, 1850
The following species were brought into synonymy:
 Microtis heckeliana (Crosse, 1871): synonym of Microtis tuberculata A. Adams, 1850
 Microtis rubra (Deshayes, 1843): synonym of Stomatolina rubra (Lamarck, J.B.P.A. de, 1822)

Distribution
This marine genus occurs off Northern Australia and in the South Pacific Ocean

References

 A. Adams, 1850, Proceedings of the Zoological Society of London, 18: 36
 Stomatia (Microtis) H. Adams & A. Adams, 1850: Higo, S., Callomon, P. & Goto, Y. (2001) Catalogue and Bibliography of the Marine Shell-Bearing Mollusca of Japan. Gastropoda Bivalvia Polyplacophora Scaphopoda Type Figures. Elle Scientific Publications, Yao, Japan, 208 pp
 Allan, J. (1935). Australian shells: ear shells and wide-mouthed shells. Aust. Mus. Mag. 5 (9)
 Wilson, B. (1993). Australian Marine Shells. Prosobranch Gastropods. Kallaroo, WA : Odyssey Publishing. Vol.1 1st Edn

External links
 To GenBank 
 To World Register of Marine Species

 
Trochidae
Gastropod genera